The Cordata CS40 was a model of IBM PC Compatible computer made by Cordata.

The Cordata CS40 used an Intel 8088 CPU running at 4.77 or 8.00 MHz (determined by a toggle switch located on the back of the PC), and shipped with no hard disk drive, 512 KiB RAM, and two 5.25" floppy drives.

Users could buy a hardcard which was a hard drive mounted on an expansion card that would fit inside. This PC was in service in 1986.

The green monochrome screen had a vertical tilt built into it to adjust the viewing angle up or down. The built-in speaker allowed basic games to be played on it.

References 

Personal computers